The following is a list of Sites of Special Scientific Interest in the Kintyre Area of Search. For other areas, see List of SSSIs by Area of Search.

 Balnabraid Glen
 Bellochantuy and Tangy Gorges
 Claonaig Wood
 Dun Ban
 Glenacardoch Point
 Kintyre Goose Lochs
 Machrihanish Dunes
 Rhunahaorine Point
 Sanda Island
 Tangy Loch
 Tarbert to Skipness Coast
 Torrisdale Cliff

 
Kintyre